Kappacher is a surname. Notable people with the surname include: 

Adam Kappacher (born 1993), Austrian freestyle skier
Walter Kappacher (born 1938), Austrian writer